The 1855 Wisconsin gubernatorial election was held on November 6, 1855. Republican Party candidate Coles Bashford was declared the winner after a court challenge, defeating Democratic incumbent William A. Barstow.

Barstow was initially declared the winner of the election, having apparently received just over 50% of the vote.  However, Bashford and the Wisconsin Attorney General, George Baldwin Smith, filed suit in the Wisconsin Supreme Court in the case Atty. Gen. ex rel. Bashford v. Barstow. They alleged that Barstow's allies had created fraudulent election returns in several fake precincts in Wisconsin's northern counties. The court found that Bashford had won the election, and was entitled to the governorship. Before the court could formally remove him from office, Barstow resigned, leaving his Lieutenant Governor Arthur MacArthur Sr., as acting Governor, until Bashford was sworn in four days later.

Results

| colspan="6" style="text-align:center;background-color: #e9e9e9;"| General Election, November 6, 1855

Results by County

References

1855
1855 Wisconsin elections
Wisconsin